Graham Ian James Cowan (4 October 1940 – 20 July 2011) was a New Zealand cricket umpire. He stood in five ODI games between 1989 and 1991.

Cowan began umpiring when he was transferred by the bank he worked for to the West Coast of the South Island in 1967. He umpired 46 first-class matches between 1972 and 1993. He also umpired 35 List A matches between 1972 and 1993. Most of his matches involved Northern Districts, and all 81 matches were held in the North Island.

Cowan was also an administrator with both the West Coast Cricket Association and Auckland Cricket, chairman of the New Zealand Cricket Umpires and Scorers Association, and chairman of Northland Cricket.

See also
 List of One Day International cricket umpires

References

1940 births
2011 deaths
New Zealand One Day International cricket umpires
New Zealand cricket administrators
People from Wellington City